The Great Depression is the second album of the British band Trigger the Bloodshed. It was released on 14 April 2009. The album was self-produced by the band and mixed by Karl Groom. A music video was released for the title track.

Track listing

Personnel
Trigger the Bloodshed
Jonny Burgan – vocals
Rob Purnell – lead guitar, backing vocals
Martyn Evans – rhythm guitar
Dave Purnell – bass
Max Blunos – drums

Production
Trigger the Bloodshed – production; at Red House Farm and Cherry Wood studios
Karl Groom – mixing; at Thin Ice Studios
Dave – mastering; at The Digital Audio Company

References

2009 albums
Trigger the Bloodshed albums
Metal Blade Records albums
Albums with cover art by Toshihiro Egawa